Alianza Nacional may refer to:

 National Alliance (Peru)
 National Alliance (Spain)
 National Alliance (Uruguay)

ca:Aliança Nacional